Stony Brook is a historic station on the Port Jefferson Branch of the Long Island Rail Road. It is located in Stony Brook, New York, adjacent to the campus of Stony Brook University, on the southeast side of New York State Route 25A, across the street from the intersection of Route 25A with Cedar Street. There is also a gated at-grade pedestrian crossing between the station and a parking lot at the University, one of only a few stations on the Long Island Rail Road to feature such crossings.

The station serves approximately 2,330 passengers each weekday.

History
The Stony Brook station was built in 1873 by the Smithtown and Port Jefferson Railroad (although some sources have claimed it was built in 1888), and rebuilt in 1917. Despite the impact of the arrival of Stony Brook University in 1957, the station has remained a small one-story depot. Parking has always been limited, but efforts to increase capacity at the station have been attempted both by SUNY and NYSDOT.

When the Flowerfield station (to the west) closed in 1958 and the Setauket station (to the east) closed in 1980, Stony Brook station became the penultimate station on the Port Jefferson Branch. In the late 1980s, high-level platforms were added and a track realignment took place. Beginning in April 2010, the Metropolitan Transportation Authority planned a renovation project that was intended to last until January 2011.

The station underwent a renovation from August 2018 to October 2018. The renovation updated the interior and exterior of the station house, added USB charging stations, free public Wi-Fi, new benches and new CCTV security cameras.

Station layout

Stony Brook is a double-tracked station, but on both ends of the station, the two tracks merge into one. Most trains use Platform B in both directions. Between 1986 and 1988, high level platforms were added and the two tracks were slightly realigned, creating a small parking lot between the station building and the platforms.

References

External links
 

 STONY Interlocking (The LIRR Today)
Stony Brook University Campus Bus Map (PDF.file)
March 1999 Photograph (Unofficial LIRR History web site)
 Station House from Google Maps Street View
Two images from 1905 (TrainsAreFun.com)

Long Island Rail Road stations in Suffolk County, New York
Railway stations in the United States opened in 1873
Brookhaven, New York
Railway stations in New York (state) at university and college campuses
1873 establishments in New York (state)
Stony Brook University